San Bartolomeo in Galdo is a comune (municipality) in the Province of Benevento in the Italian region Campania, located about 90 km northeast of Naples and about 35 km northeast of Benevento, on a hill overlooking the valley of the Fortore river.

Overview
The economy is mostly based on agriculture. San Bartolomeo lost some half of its population after World War II, due to extensive emigration.

The climate is sub-continental, with hot and dry summers, long and cold winters with extensive snowfalls. The average temperatures are +17/+27,5 °C in July, and +1,5/+6 °C in January.
The town's greatest son was Rocky Marciano born Rocco Marchegiano. His mother was Pasqualina Picciuto who immigrated from San Bartolomeo in Galdo to Brockton, Massachusetts with husband Pierino Marchegiano (from Ripa Teatina, Abruzzo).

Main sights
Chiesa Madre ("Mother Church"), with early-15th century two portals taken from the badia of Santa Maria  a Mazzocca.
Church of the Annunziata, also characterized by a portal from 1498.
Baroque convent of the Minor Friars (17th century).

References

External links

Cities and towns in Campania